The 1981 World Rally Championship was the ninth season of the Fédération Internationale de l'Automobile (FIA) World Rally Championship (WRC). The season consisted of 12 rallies. While this number was the same as the previous year, one change was made to the schedule, replacing New Zealand with the Brazil.

The 1981 World Rally Championship for Drivers was won by Ari Vatanen driving a Rothmans Rally Team Ford Escort RS1800, the only time a privateer team has won the Drivers' Championship until 2017. The Makes' Championship was won by Talbot with their Sunbeam Lotus. It also saw the beginning of a new era in the sport with the arrival of the Audi Quattro, the first four-wheel drive rally car. Initially regarded as too heavy and complex for rally stages, it proved its worth with three wins in its debut season, including a maiden victory for Michèle Mouton at the Rallye Sanremo, the only woman to win a WRC event.


Teams and drivers

Championships

Events

See also 
 1981 in sports

External links

 FIA World Rally Championship 1981 at ewrc-results.com

World Rally Championship
World Rally Championship seasons